Static-X is an American heavy metal band from Los Angeles, California, formed in 1994. The line-up has fluctuated over the years, but was long-held constant with band founder, frontman, vocalist and rhythm guitarist Wayne Static until his death in 2014.

The band was founded by Static and original drummer Ken Jay. They rose to fame with their 1999 debut album Wisconsin Death Trip where their heavy industrial metal sound attracted attention within the burgeoning nu metal movement of the late 1990s, with the album eventually going platinum in the United States. The band released five more albums over the course of the next decade: Machine in 2001, Shadow Zone in 2003, Start a War in 2005, Cannibal in 2007, and Cult of Static in 2009.

The band entered a hiatus while Static worked on his solo album, Pighammer, in 2011. Static briefly reformed Static-X in 2012, using only members of his solo album's touring band, before officially breaking up in June 2013. On November 1, 2014, Wayne Static died at the age of 48.

The rest of the original Static-X lineup – bassist Tony Campos, lead guitarist Koichi Fukuda and drummer Ken Jay – announced on October 23, 2018, that they were reforming the band in Static's honor, and would release Project: Regeneration Vol. 1, their first studio album in eleven years, in 2020. The band announced a follow-up album, Project: Regeneration Vol. 2, on November 3,, 2023.

History

Formation, Wisconsin Death Trip and Machine (1994–2001)

Static-X was founded in 1994 after the disbandment of Wayne Static's prior band, Deep Blue Dream. Static played in the band in the late 1980s with future Smashing Pumpkins frontman Billy Corgan. However, when the Smashing Pumpkins began to gain popularity, Corgan made the choice to commit all of his attention to The Smashing Pumpkins, and the band eventually disbanded. Static and Ken Jay later moved to Los Angeles to start a new band with guitarist Emerson Swinford, whom they had met through their mutual friend, Chicago singer-songwriter, PJ Olsson. They formed a band called Drill, which included Tony Campos on bass and started performing in the LA music scene. After Swinford left to pursue touring and session work, they recruited guitarist Koichi Fukuda, and renamed the band Static; however, during the recording of their debut album, they realized there were multiple other bands named Static, and subsequently renamed the band to Static-X.

Static-X signed with Warner Bros. Records in early 1998, and released their debut album, Wisconsin Death Trip, on March 23, 1999. Soon after, they released their first single "Push It", followed by "I'm with Stupid" and "Bled for Days" in 2000. Static-X toured strictly in support of the album and twice performed on Ozzfest, supporting Fear Factory. In the following year, a promotional EP, The Death Trip Continues, was also released.

The band toured heavily in support of the album, with Static recounting:

"It was really just a whirlwind and I barely remember it. We worked so hard and toured so hard that I don't even remember most of it. We played 300 shows in the first year and we just never went home. We would tour on one tour for six or eight weeks and that tour would end somewhere on the East Coast and we'd drive a couple days and hook up with Slayer and tour with them for four or five weeks. That tour ends and then we'd drive a few days to Boston to hook up with Sevendust. We just kept going and kept going and never went home. I mean I didn't even have a home. I lived at the rehearsal space for the last year before we started touring. I had to quit my job to make the record so I didn't have anywhere to even go home to...I look back at it now and I kinda wish I had taken the time to sit back and appreciate it more. Maybe got to know some of the other bands a little more and spend time and having a good time and partying and maybe taking some pictures of the other guys."

Commercially, the effort paid off, with the album eventually going platinum in 2001. The follow-up tour was documented on the DVD Where the Hell Are We and What Day Is It... This Is Static-X. However, the pressure of recording a follow-up was hard on Static and the rest of the band. Static, worried they would be unable to deliver another successful album, desired to start work on follow up material while still touring in support of Wisconsin Death Trip, while the rest of the band wanted to focus on enjoying the touring. Without support, Static took matters into his own hands, writing all of the material himself over the course of the two years of touring. This caused friction from within the band, who resented Static for not waiting for them or including them in on the creation process, of which all members had been part of in the prior album. Fukuda would leave the band upon the conclusion of the tour, leading the band to record the album as a three-piece; Static would later describe the split both as "amicable" and "definitely not [...] amicable". Despite this, the band still managed to find success, with the second album, Machine, releasing on May 22, 2001, and eventually being certified gold with 500,000 units sold. Tripp Eisen replaced Fukuda on guitar for touring in support of the album.

Shadow Zone and Start a War (2002–2006)

In 2002, Static was contacted by Jonathan Davis of the nu metal band Korn. Davis had recently signed on to provide the soundtrack for the Queen of the Damned film soundtrack, but due to contract limitations with Sony, was legally unable to actually perform the music he had written for the soundtrack. As a remedy of this, Davis contacted a number of metal vocalists, Static included, to sing on the songs he had written. Static provided vocals for one track, "Not Meant for Me", with the Queen of the Damned soundtrack releasing in February 2002.

The contribution was a turning point for the band; the track, which was much more melodic than much of the band's music up until that point, would attract the attention of Warner Brother's executive Tom Whalley, who pressured the band as a whole to pursue a melodic sound. Personnel and line-up changes would further alter the band's sound. The label would not allow the band to work again with record producer Ulrich Wild as they had for their prior two albums, instead arranging for them to work with Josh Abraham, a producer known for working with more commercially melodically mainstream bands such as Staind, Filter, and Velvet Revolver. The album was the first to feature Eisen's songwriting contributions and performances, and the only to feature sessions drummer Josh Freese, of A Perfect Circle, due to Jay leaving the band two days before beginning the formal recording process. Jay has been reluctant to talk about his reasons for leaving, but implied it was Static's escalating substance abuse.

The band's third album, Shadow Zone, was released on October 7, 2003, and debuted at no. 20 on the Billboard 200 charts, but failed to achieve the platinum or gold selling status of their prior two albums. Two singles were released to promote the album, "The Only" and "So". The band proceeded to hire on Nick Oshiro, formerly of Seether, was selected as Jay's replacement and the band's permanent drummer, to tour in support of the album.

July 20, 2004 saw the release of Beneath... Between... Beyond..., a collection of rarities and demos. Shortly after the release of Beneath... Between... Beyond..., the band toured again with Fear Factory, and commenced work on their fourth studio album, Start a War. In February 2005, Tripp Eisen was arrested in a sex scandal involving minors, and was subsequently fired from the band. Former guitarist Koichi Fukuda, who had been providing samples and keyboards for the new album, rejoined Static-X to fill the gap left by Eisen. Start a War was finally released on June 14, 2005. "I'm the One" and "Dirthouse" were released as singles from the album.

Cannibal and Cult of Static (2007–2009)

Their fifth album, Cannibal, released on April 3, 2007, marked the studio return of their original guitarist, Koichi Fukuda. One of the new tracks called "No Submission" was released on the Saw III soundtrack prior to the album's release.  "Cannibal" was released as a digital download single at iTunes. "Destroyer" was released as a lead off radio single, before the album was released.

On March 20, the album was preceded with an exclusive Destroyer EP, with a video being produced for the title track. The album itself debuted at No. 36 in the U.S. with sales of over 30,000.
	
On May 10, 2007 it was announced that the band would be playing on the main stage at Ozzfest 2007. Additionally, at the time, Static first announced his intention to release solo material, referring to it as "Pighammer". In the meantime, in November 2007, Campos temporarily joined Ministry as a touring bassist for Ministry's C U LaTour in the wake of Paul Raven's death.

The band began working on their sixth studio album, Cult of Static, in January 2008 after returning from the Operation Annihilation tour in Australia. Static stated they intended to mix the longer buildups and break downs from Wisconsin Death Trip with the heaviness that was present on Cannibal. On October 14, 2008 Static-X released their live CD/DVD, Cannibal Killers Live. On December 11, 2008 Static revealed the album's release date and name saying "I had hoped to announce it here first, but my publicist beat me to the punch! The new record is indeed entitled Cult of Static and will be released March 17. The "cult" part of the title is not to be taken in any religious manner, I am referring to and giving respect to the loyalty of all you good people that have supported us through the years. This record is definitely darker than Cannibal and has more synths and loops as well. And this is also the most crushing guitar tone I have ever had. There are 11 songs instead of our usual 12, and they are mostly longer and more epic than ever before." The album debut at No. 16 on the Billboard 200 chart, the highest  since their second studio album, Machine. A new Static-X song called "Lunatic" appeared on soundtrack to the movie Marvel's Punisher: War Zone. Drummer Nick Oshiro left Static-X prior to the start of the tour, being replaced by touring drummer Will Hunt. The tour in support of the album lasted for the rest of the year, playing major concerts such as the Download Festival and Rock on the Range.

Hiatus, breakup and Wayne Static's death (2010–2017)
After finishing their final tour dates in Australia at the end of 2009, the band began to cave to Static's friction with the rest of the band: Fukuda wanted to focus more on his new family, and Oshiro's newfound sobriety was clashing with Static's substance abuse; Campos would later call this stage of the band a "toxic environment". Static announced that he would be focusing on his side project, then tentatively titled Pighammer. He later revealed that Campos had left the band, and eventually joined the metal band Soulfly. but clarified that the band had not broken up, but rather, members were just doing different projects at the time - Campos maintains he never left the band. Static began his solo touring in 2011, most notably playing at Graspop Metal Meeting 2011. He released his debut solo album Pighammer on October 4, 2011.

In 2012, Wayne Static decided to reform Static-X, but none of the original members would join him.  Instead his solo band would tour under the name Static-X. In June 2013, Static announced Static-X's official break-up. Static blamed it on a disagreement with Campos over the rights of the band; citing that Campos was paid by Wayne for the use of the name while touring, but during that tour, Wayne took ill; in a 2019 post, former tour manager Eric Dinkelmann claimed, however, that the illness was just an official cover and the real reason for the tour cancellation was "a drug bust", which Campos would later also allude to. Static ended the band soon afterwards.  Despite breaking up the band, Static still performed the band's music under his own name and solo band in 2014, most notably playing the Wisconsin Death Trip album in its entirety to celebrate the album's fifteenth anniversary. In a 2022 interview, Edsel Dope, who was on the same tour bill as Static at the time, recalled that the tour experience revealed to him the depths of Static's drug addiction, and that while he made an effort to convince Static to reform the full band, he was "not sure without rehab it will be possible".

On November 1, 2014, Wayne Static died at the age of 48. Static's wife, Tera Wray, released a statement stating that despite Static's prior history of drug use, he had stopped his drug use in 2009, and that his death was not drug or overdose related. Despite her claims, the coroner's report, released in March 2015, indicated that his death was the result of a combination of excessive prescription drugs and alcohol in his system, though the manner of death was deemed "natural." Wray herself died of suicide in 2016.

Reunion and Project: Regeneration (2018–present)
On October 23, 2018, original members Tony Campos, Koichi Fukuda and Ken Jay revealed plans for Static-X to reunite and to release a new album in 2019 called Project Regeneration, which would include previously unreleased tracks with Wayne Static's vocals and guest vocals by David Draiman, Ivan Moody, Dez Fafara, Burton C. Bell, Al Jourgensen, Edsel Dope and others.

The band also embarked on a worldwide tour in 2019 to celebrate the 20th anniversary of their debut album Wisconsin Death Trip as well as a memorial to Wayne Static, featuring an unidentified vocalist named "Xer0" wearing a mask some confused to be that of Wayne Static. This decision received mixed feedback, with some journalists calling it a "creepy Wayne Static cosplay" and "zombie Wayne Static". The band insisted that Static's family gave the band their blessing, and Jay noted that it fit Static's "terrifically morbid sense of humour". While Xer0's identity has never been officially revealed, speculation has generally pointed at Dope singer Edsel Dope. Edsel himself has denied this. The mask was made by Laney Chantal, wife of Twiggy Ramirez.

On February 6, 2020, the band released the first new song from their forthcoming and renamed album Project: Regeneration Vol. 1 titled "Hollow (Project Regeneration)". and announced that Project Regeneration would now consist of two volumes, both with at least 10 songs, all of them with vocals by Wayne Static. The album was slated to be released May 15, 2020, but was eventually pushed to be released on July 10, 2020 due to the manufacturing delays associated with the COVID-19 pandemic. The band resumed work on Volume 2 shortly after the release of the first volume.

On August 22, 2021, Campos stated that the band is currently working on Project: Regeneration Vol. 2, which will also consist of recovered material, as well as entirely new songs. On February 8, 2023, the band announced the album would be released later in the year on November 3. That same day, the band released the album's lead single, a cover of Nine Inch Nails' "Terrible Lie".

Musical style and influences
Static-X has been described as industrial metal, nu metal, alternative metal, rap metal, hard rock, industrial music and industrial pop. Self-described as "evil disco", Static-X's style, according to The Washington Post, "combines electronic elements influenced by industrial artists such as Ministry and Skinny Puppy with the harshness of bands like Pantera". Static-X's style also has used elements of genres such as techno, speed metal, and thrash metal.

Wayne Static has cited house music as an influence on Static-X's music. Static also has said that throughout 1994 to 1996, he listened to the Prodigy and the Crystal Method. Static has said that he "imagined Static-X was gonna be like a Prodigy or a Crystal Method and more of an electronic-based thing". Static-X's influences include the Crystal Method, the Prodigy, Prong, Pantera, Ministry, Korn, the Sisters of Mercy, the Chemical Brothers, Joy Division, Kiss, Mortician, Fear Factory and Crowbar.

A recurring mention in the band's material was the mention of "Otsego", a reference to Otsego, Michigan, with songs named after the town including "Otsegolation", "Otsego Undead", "Otsegolectric", "Otsego Amigo", "Disco Otsego" and "Otsego Placebo"; Wayne Static attended Western Michigan University and at the time used a fake ID that claimed he was "Dean from Otsego".

Band members

Current members
Tony Campos – bass, backing vocals (1994–2010, 2018–present)
Koichi Fukuda – lead guitar, keyboards, programming (1994–2001, 2005–2010, 2018–present)
Ken Jay – drums (1994–2003, 2018–present)
Xer0 – lead vocals, rhythm guitar (2018–present)

Former members
Wayne Static – lead vocals, rhythm guitar (1994–2010, 2012–2013; died 2014); keyboards, programming (2001–2005, 2012–2013)
Tripp Eisen – lead guitar (2001–2005)
Nick Oshiro – drums (2003–2010)
Brent Ashley – bass, backing vocals (2012)
Andy the Kid – bass, backing vocals (2012–2013)
Diego Ibarra – lead guitar (2012–2013)
Sean Davidson – drums (2012–2013)

Touring members
Will Hunt – drums (2010)
Bevan Davies – drums (2010)

Timeline

Discography

Studio albums

Wisconsin Death Trip (1999)
Machine (2001)
Shadow Zone (2003)
Start a War (2005)
Cannibal (2007)
Cult of Static (2009)
Project: Regeneration Vol. 1 (2020)
Project: Regeneration Vol. 2 (2023)

References

Further reading

External links

1994 establishments in California
American alternative metal musical groups
American industrial metal musical groups
Nu metal musical groups from California
Musical groups established in 1994
Musical groups disestablished in 2010
Musical groups reestablished in 2012
Musical groups disestablished in 2013
Musical groups reestablished in 2018
Musical groups from Los Angeles
Musical quartets
Reprise Records artists
 
Warner Records artists